Manchester City Football Club, an English professional association football club, has gained entry to Union of European Football Associations (UEFA) competitions on several occasions. They have represented England in the European Cup (now the Champions League) on twelve occasions, the UEFA Cup (now the Europa League) on seven occasions, and the now-defunct Cup Winners' Cup twice. Manchester City are one of thirteen English football clubs to have won a European title, in City's case the 1969–70 Cup Winners' Cup.

The club's first entry into European competition occurred in 1968, as a result of winning the 1967–68 Football League Championship. However, the participation was short-lived, as the club suffered a surprise defeat at the hands of Fenerbahçe in the first round. Entry into the Cup Winners' Cup the following season was more successful; Manchester City won the competition, defeating Górnik Zabrze 2–1 at the Prater Stadium in Vienna. The club reached the semi-final of the same competition the following year, and continued to play European football regularly during the 1970s. The club then endured a period of decline, and did not play in Europe again until 2003, a gap of 24 years. Since then the club has qualified for European competition on a regular basis; they progressed past the quarter-final stage of a continental competition three times during that period, reaching the semi-finals of the 2015–16 and 2021–22 UEFA Champions League, as well as losing their first ever European Cup final to Chelsea in 2020–21.

In the 1970s Manchester City also had a track record of repeated entry into several of the non-UEFA sanctioned European competitions which were run in the era, including the Anglo-Italian League Cup and the Texaco Cup.

History

First entries into European competition
European club football competitions began in the mid-1950s. Though Manchester City were moderately successful domestically in this period, the club did not play in Europe. City were not invited to play in the Inter-Cities Fairs Cup, and the UEFA Cup Winners' Cup did not begin until 1960. When eight players from neighbours Manchester United lost their lives in the Munich air disaster when returning from a European Cup match in February 1958, UEFA wished for City to take United's place in the competition. City rejected the idea out of hand.

Manchester City's first appearance in European competition occurred in the 1968–69 season. City played in the European Cup, by virtue of having won the 1967–68 league championship. Extroverted Manchester City coach Malcolm Allison made a number of grandiose statements predicting how the team would fare, saying that City would "terrify Europe", and that "City will attack these people as they have not been attacked since the days of the old Real Madrid". The opposition in the first round was Turkish club Fenerbahçe. The City management did not scout Fenerbahçe in advance of the game, opting to rely on a report from Oscar Hold, an Englishman who had managed Fenerbahçe between 1965 and 1967. In the first leg at Maine Road, City had what the Guardians Albert Barham called "overwhelming territorial advantage". However, to the frustration of the home crowd City were denied by a strong defensive performance by Fenerbahçe, most notably by goalkeeper Yavuz Şimşek, and the match finished 0–0. The return leg in Istanbul was played in front of a Turkish record crowd. City took an early lead through Tony Coleman, but conceded two goals in the second half and were eliminated.

Manchester City won the 1969 FA Cup Final to earn a place in the 1969–70 UEFA Cup Winners' Cup. Their first tie was against Athletic Bilbao, in Spain's Basque Country. Athletic were themselves managed by an Englishman, Ronnie Allen. In the first leg, City recovered from a two-goal deficit to secure a 3–3 draw. The home leg was a comfortable 3–0 win. Post-match reports alleged that a scuffle had taken place at half-time between Mike Doyle and José Ramón Betzuen, The referee spoke to both managers, but did not take any further action.

In the second round City travelled to Belgians Lierse S.K., and won the first leg 3–0, with two goals from Francis Lee and one from Colin Bell. The home leg produced a 5–0 win, a club record for European competition that stood until 2019. The first leg of the quarter-final, at Académica de Coimbra, took place three days before Manchester City were due to play in the League Cup final. Malcolm Allison rejected the prevailing British football orthodoxy, in which domestic competitions took priority, by saying he would rather win in Portugal than in the League Cup final. The match finished goalless. At Maine Road, extra-time was required for Manchester City to break down the stubbornly defensive Coimbra. Tony Towers scored the only goal of the tie with a minute of extra-time remaining.

The draw for the semi-finals meant Manchester City played the away leg first in every round, this time in Germany, where Schalke 04 were the opposition. Manchester City lost the first leg by a single goal. Needing to win at Maine Road by at least two goals, Manchester City used a very attacking approach. It worked; City led 3–0 at half-time, and won the match 5–1. In the final, City faced Górnik Zabrze of Poland, who had progressed via a coin toss after three matches with AS Roma could not produce a winner in the other semi-final. Goalkeeper Hubert Kostka parried the ball, only for it to land at the feet of Neil Young for a simple finish. Shortly after City defender Mike Doyle sustained an ankle injury after colliding with Stefan Florenski. Manchester City played on with ten men for a period as Doyle received treatment from trainer Dave Ewing, but the defender was unable to continue. Substitute Ian Bowyer replaced him. The change prompted an alteration in formation, in which Colin Bell switched to a deeper position. Shortly before half-time, Young won the ball after loose play from Florenski, which put him clear on goal. As Young moved into the penalty area Kostka rushed out of his goal and upended him, leaving the referee no option but to give a penalty. Lee struck the spot-kick with power into the centre of the goal. Kostka's legs made contact with the ball, but the force of the shot carried it into the net to make it 2–0.James, The Big Book of City, p. 41. Górnik got a goal back midway through the second half, but there were no more goals and the match finished 2–1.

After the match City manager Joe Mercer said "the heavy rain in the second half ruined the game" and that he was "quite happy with the performance of our team, although the technical level was rather low in the second half". Górnik manager Michał Matyas blamed his side's poor start, saying the "first goal came too early for us and we never recovered from this shock." The trophy was Manchester City's fourth major honour in three seasons. It made them the third English club to win the Cup Winners' Cup, after Tottenham Hotspur and West Ham United.

Regular participation in the 1970s
As title holders, Manchester City were entitled to defend the Cup Winners' Cup in the 1970–71 season. Had they not won the trophy, they would still have been qualified for European competition, as City's victory in the 1970 League Cup granted a place in the Fairs Cup. As a UEFA-organised competition, the Cup Winners' Cup took precedence over the Fairs Cup, and so the club took a place in the former. In the first round Manchester City almost suffered an upset at the hands of Linfield, from Belfast. City held a one-goal lead after the first leg, but Linfield twice took the lead in the second leg. The match finished 2–1 to Linfield, and Manchester City progressed on the away goals rule. Honvéd were the opposition in the second round. Manchester City won both legs, the score 3–0 on aggregate.

The quarter-final saw a rematch with Górnik Zabrze, who City had beaten in the previous year's final. Both legs finished 2–0 to the home team, so to separate the sides a third match was played on neutral ground, in Copenhagen. Despite having several players unavailable through injury, City won this match 3–1, and were drawn to play fellow English club Chelsea in the semi-final, the first time Manchester City had drawn another English club in European competition. Further injuries occurred in domestic fixtures in the run-up to the game, to the extent that goalkeeper Joe Corrigan played the first leg of the Chelsea tie unable to fully open his left eye because of a facial injury. City lost the first leg at Stamford Bridge 1–0. Corrigan was unable to play in the second leg, in which stand-in goalkeeper Ron Healey conceded an own goal, resulting in another 1–0 defeat.

A mid-table finish in the 1970–71 season meant that for the first time in four years Manchester City did not qualify for Europe. The following year, a fourth place league finish gave the club a berth in the UEFA Cup for the first time. The UEFA Cup had replaced the Fairs Cup in 1971, when control of the competition transferred to UEFA. City's debut in the competition was a short one. Drawn against a Valencia side managed by Alfredo Di Stéfano, City were bounced out in the 2nd leg at the Mestalla 3–2, despite producing a pulsating 2–2 draw at Maine Road in the 1st leg.

Triumph in the 1976 League Cup final gave Manchester City a place in the UEFA Cup after a four-year absence. City drew Juventus in the first round. Drawn at home first, City won the first leg 1–0, Brian Kidd scoring his first goal for the club. The second leg in Turin resulted in a 2–0 defeat and elimination. Juventus went on to win the competition. As league runners-up in the 1976–77 season, City again qualified for the UEFA Cup. Drawn against Widzew Łódź, the Blues drew the first leg at Maine Road 2–2. In the late 1970s, hooliganism was becoming a more prominent part of English football. Following an incident where a fan invaded the pitch and attacked Widzew's Zbigniew Boniek, City were fined by UEFA, and fencing was erected between the pitch and the stands. A 0–0 draw in Łódź resulted in City's elimination on the away goals rule.

A fifth-place finish in the 1977–78 season proved sufficient to qualify for the UEFA Cup once again. Dutchmen FC Twente were the first opposition. In Enschede, Dave Watson gave City the lead. Twente equalised in the second half from a free kick.
In the second leg City ran up a 3–1 lead, but a second Twente goal meant a nervy finish. City held on, preserving their 3–2 lead to win the tie. This was the first time the club had progressed past the first round of the UEFA Cup in four attempts. Further opposition from the Low Countries awaited in the second round, in the form of Standard Liège. A flurry of late goals gave Manchester City a 4–0 lead after the first leg. The large lead meant that despite a 2–0 defeat in Liège, in which Gary Owen received a red card, City progressed with ease. Owen's sending off resulted in a five match ban.

In the third round City faced four-time European trophy winners A.C. Milan. The first leg, held at the San Siro, was initially postponed due to fog, and was instead played the following day. City took a 2–0 lead and came close to becoming the first English team to beat Milan at the San Siro, but conceded twice; the equaliser scored eight minutes from time. City won the home leg 3–0, with goals from Booth, Hartford and Kidd. City's first European quarter-final since 1971 was against Borussia Mönchengladbach. The club received advice from Bob Paisley, whose Liverpool had met Mönchengladbach several times. City opened the scoring in the first leg, but while attempting to extend their lead were caught on the counter-attack and conceded an equaliser. After failing to win the home leg, having conceded an away goal in the process, City travelled to Germany with few expecting them to progress. So it proved, as City lost 3–1 at the Bökelbergstadion.

Return to Europe in the 2000s; little progress in the early 2010s
Manchester City's fortunes declined during the 1980s and 1990s. For a single season, 1998–99, the club fell as far as English football's third tier. The club did not qualify for European competition in this period. In ordinary circumstances, the club's fifth-placed finish in 1991 and 1992 would have granted a UEFA Cup place. However, English clubs had recently returned from a ban issued after the Heysel Stadium disaster. As the UEFA coefficient that determines the number of places per country is based upon performances in European competition over the previous five years, England had a reduced allocation until 1995.

By the 2002–03 season, Manchester City were back in the Premier League. An unusual route into European competition for the 2003–04 season was provided by the UEFA Respect Fair Play ranking, which allocated extra UEFA Cup qualifying round places for the leagues with the best records for discipline and positive play. This marked Manchester City's first European participation for 24 years. In the qualifying round City played Welsh club Total Network Solutions. The first leg was the first-ever competitive match at Manchester City's new ground, the City of Manchester Stadium. Trevor Sinclair became the first ever goalscorer at the stadium in a 5–0 win. In the hope of attracting a large crowd, TNS switched the second leg to Millennium Stadium, the national stadium of Wales. With the tie effectively won, City made 10 changes to their team. The match finished 2–0 to City. Against Sporting Lokeren in the first round proper, City won the home leg 3–2, and the away leg 1–0. A tie against Groclin Dyskobolia followed. Both legs were drawn, and just as in 1976, City were eliminated on away goals after a 0–0 draw in Poland.

In 2008, Manchester City once again qualified for the UEFA Cup through the Fair Play rankings. As City had to play the qualifying rounds, it meant a very early start to the season, in mid-July. Their first match was a trip to the remote Faroe Islands to play EB/Streymur. As Streymur's ground had a capacity of only 1,000, the match was moved to Tórsvøllur, the Faroese national stadium. Two early goals gave City a 2–0 win. The home leg was unusual in that it was played outside Manchester. The pitch at the City of Manchester Stadium had been relaid following a Bon Jovi concert, and was not ready in time. Instead, the match was played at Barnsley's Oakwell ground. Another 2–0 win resulted in a 4–0 aggregate scoreline. In the second qualifying round City played FC Midtjylland. The first leg ended in a 1–0 defeat, only City's second ever home defeat in European competition. In the second leg City looked to be heading out of the competition until an 89th minute cross was diverted into his own net by Midtjylland's Danny Califf. The tie then went to extra time, and City progressed on penalties. In the first round proper Cypriots AC Omonia took the lead, but City overcame the deficit and won 2–1, and also won the second leg by the same scoreline.

A five team group stage then followed, in which each team played the others once. Manchester City were drawn with Twente, Schalke 04, Racing de Santander and Paris Saint-Germain. City topped the group, after wins against Twente and Schalke, a draw with Paris Saint-Germain and a defeat in a dead rubber in Santander. The knockout stages then resumed, with a visit to F.C. Copenhagen in freezing conditions. City took the lead twice but could only draw 2–2. The home leg was more comfortable, and ended in a 2–1 victory. Another Danish club, Aalborg, awaited in the next round. Both matches finished 2–0 to the home side, and the tie was decided by a penalty shootout, which Manchester City won. City then faced Hamburger SV, in their first European quarter-final since 1979. The away leg was played first, and started exceptionally well for Manchester City, as Stephen Ireland scored after just 35 seconds. However, Hamburg soon equalised, and won the match 3–1. A difficult task in the home leg soon became even harder, when Hamburg scored an away goal early in the match. City scored twice, the first by Elano, who also hit the woodwork on two occasions with free-kicks. However, City could not produce the third goal that would have taken the tie into extra time.

UEFA rebranded and restructured the UEFA Cup in 2009, resulting in it becoming the UEFA Europa League. By finishing fifth in the 2009–10 Premier League, Manchester City qualified for this competition. A play-off round took place before the four team group stage, in which Manchester City beat Timișoara of Romania home and away. City's group stage opponents were Juventus, Red Bull Salzburg and Lech Poznań. Each team played the others twice. City's opener was in Salzburg, and resulted in a 2–0 win. A 1–1 draw at home to Juventus then followed. A 3–1 win at home to Lech Poznań is remembered primarily not for the action on the pitch, in which Emmanuel Adebayor scored a hat-trick, but for the actions of the Polish supporters, whose backs to the pitch dance was later adopted by Manchester City fans, for whom it became known as The Poznań. The return match with Lech Poznań resulted in a 3–1 defeat, but a 3–0 home victory over Red Bull Salzburg ensured qualification with a match to spare. The dead rubber against Juventus ended 1–1, and Manchester City won the group. In the knockout stages City then beat Aris Thessaloniki 3–0 on aggregate, and met Dynamo Kyiv in the last 16. City lost 2–0 in Kyiv, and had to play most of the second leg with ten men after Mario Balotelli was sent off. A 1–0 win was insufficient to overcome the deficit, as City lost 2–1 on aggregate.

Manchester City finished third in the 2010–11 Premier League, to qualify for the rebranded version of the European Cup, the UEFA Champions League, for the first time since 1968. The club's league finish granted direct entry into the group stages without qualification. Their group stage opponents were Bayern Munich, Villarreal and Napoli. City's first group match was at home to Napoli. The Italians took the lead in the second half following a counter-attacking move, but five minutes later Aleksandar Kolarov scored from a free-kick to equalise, and the match finished 1–1. City then lost 2–0 at Bayern Munich, a match most notable for the refusal of Carlos Tevez to come on as substitute, which resulted in an exile from the first team lasting nearly six months. A double-header with Villarreal resulted in two Manchester City wins. Sergio Agüero scored a last-minute winner in the first, which finished 2–1; the second was a comfortable 3–0 victory. A 2–1 defeat at Napoli then took qualification out of Manchester City's hands, and despite a 2–0 win against group winners Bayern Munich, City finished third in the group and failed to qualify for the knockout stages.

As a third placed team the club then entered the Europa League in the round of 32, where they faced Europa League holders Porto. Manchester City won both legs. Agüero's goal after 19 seconds of the second leg was the second fastest in the history of the competition. City returned to Portugal in the next round, against Lisbon club Sporting CP. City lost the first leg 0–1 in Lisbon and were trailing 0–2 early in the home game. The team mounted a great comeback, scoring three goals, but it was not enough, as they were eliminated on away goals rule.

Manchester City qualified for the 2012–13 UEFA Champions League as league champions and hope were high for the team to perform successfully. The team was drawn with Real Madrid, Borussia Dortmund, and AFC Ajax. Cityzens failed to win even a single watch, losing three and drawing three and failed to progress even to the Europa League knock-out stage, finishing last in their group.

The 2013–14 UEFA Champions League campaign was a watershed moment for the team, as they won five games in the group stage and qualified for the knockout phase for the first time since 1968. However, City's performance in the round of 16 was a disappointment, as they dropped both games to Barcelona with an aggregate score of 1–4. The team's next Champions League campaign was similar to the previous one, as Manchester City were again drawn with Bayern Munich and CSKA Moscow in the group stage and, after qualifying for the playoffs as the second best team, Cityzens once again had to face Barcelona. The final result saw little improvement, as Man City again lost both games but this time with an aggregate score of 1–3. Barça went on to win the tournament.

The 2015–16 UEFA Champions League campaign went on to become the most successful in history for City as they reached the semi-finals before being eliminated by Real Madrid after drawing the home game and losing at the Santiago Bernabéu 0–1. Real Madrid went on to win the tournament. The Cityzens eliminated Dynamo Kyiv and Paris on their way to the semi-finals.

Under Pep Guardiola: 2016 to present day, top 4 UEFA ranking, first-ever Champions League final
In the first season under the reign Pep Guardiola, hopes were high for Manchester City as they progressed to the knockout phase after finishing second in the group that featured Guardiola's former team, Barcelona. City lost their away match to Barça 0–4, but then rebounded to win 3–1 at home. In the Round of 16 City were drawn against Monaco. The Blues were trailing 1–2 and 2–3 in their home match before scoring three unanswered goals and winning 5–3. In the away game, the Cityzens were down 0–2 when Leroy Sané scored to put City in front of the tie again, but Tiémoué Bakayoko's late goal meant that Monaco progressed further and City were eliminated.

2017–18 season was an undoubted success for the Blues domestically, but their European campaign was quite underwhelming. The team confidently won five games in the group stage and qualified for the knockout stage, where they defeated Basel 5–2 on aggregate. The Cityzens were drawn with fellow Premier League side Liverpool in the quarter-finals. The outcome of those games was an utter devastation as Manchester City were thrashed 5–1 on aggregate and eliminated amid the controversy with refereeing mistakes favourable to Liverpool. The Premier League title where City achieved 100 points was somewhat a consolation for this anticlimactic European campaign.

Manchester City were one of the favourites prior to their 2018–19 Champions league campaign. The team again won their group with 13 points, then defeated Schalke 04 in the Round of 16, winning their home game with a record 7–0 scoreline. Similarly to the previous season, Manchester City were drawn against an English club in the quarter-finals, this time Tottenham Hotspur. The Blues lost the away game 0–1, with Agüero missing a penalty. In the home leg, Sterling scored early for the hosts, but then City quickly conceded two goals and now needed to score three. They did exactly that, leading 4–2 twenty minutes before the end of the game, but Fernando Llorente's wrongly awarded handball meant that City were again required to score. In stoppage time, Sterling converted a pass from Agüero to seemingly send City through. However, the goal was disallowed after a VAR review, and the Blues were eliminated in a heartbreaking fashion. Manchester City swept all their domestic tournaments that season, but were still unable to add European success.

Acknowledging that City would be judged by their Champions League performance after all, Pep Guardiola stated that the new season's main objective would be to win the European title. The Cityzens progressed to the knockout phase and faced old foes Real Madrid there. City won the away game 2–1, but the remainder of the tournament was indefinitely postponed due to the COVID–19 pandemic. Finally, UEFA announced that the tournament would be resumed in August 2020. The home match against Madrid was scheduled for 7 August. Thanks to goals from Raheem Sterling and Gabriel Jesus, the Citizens once again defeated Madrid 2–1, achieving a 4–2 victory on aggregate and advancing to the quarter-finals. Man City faced Lyon on 15 August, losing 3–1 and exiting the Champions league at the quarter-final stage for the third year in a row.

The 2020–21 campaign saw City top its group with a club record of 16 points, twice defeating Marseille and Olympiacos, and collecting four points against Porto. In the round of 16, the Blues were paired with Borussia Mönchengladbach and progressed to the quarter-finals for the fourth consecutive year after winning both legs 2–0. In the quarter-finals, City were paired against another German outfit, this time Borussia Dortmund. The Blues managed to neutralize Dortmund's inform striker Erling Haaland to win the double-legged tie 4–2 on aggregate after two identical 2–1 wins home and away. In the semi-finals, Manchester City were drawn against reigning finalists Paris Saint-Germain who'd avenged their loss to Bayern Munich in the 2020 final by knocking out the German club in their quarter-final tie on away goals. City rallied from behind to win 2–1 at the Parc des Princes thanks to goals by Kevin De Bruyne and Riyad Mahrez. In the second leg, a goal in either half from Mahrez booked City's place in their first-ever European Cup final, which happened to be an all-English affair against Chelsea, with a stylish 4–1 aggregate victory. The final took place at the Estádio do Dragão in Porto, Portugal, and the Citizens were defeated 1–0 by a lone goal scored by Kai Havertz in an anticlimactic game. Still, City's breakthrough marked its most successful European campaign to date. As a consequence of that successful campaign, City entered the top 4 in the UEFA rankings, placing third.

City once again reached the Champions League semi-finals in the 2021–22 competition. They won a group including Paris Sant Germain, RB Leipzig and Club Brugges with four victories and two defeats. In the round of 16 they earnt a commanding first leg lead in their tie against Sporting Lisbon, beating the Portuguese champions 5–0 away including a brace from Bernardo Silva. before wrapping up the victory with a 0–0 draw at home. In the quarter-final a 1–0 victory in the first leg at home gave City a slight advantage against Atlético as they headed to Madrid. An intense and maturely hard fought 0–0 draw then ensured City progressed to the semi-finals. There, City beat Real Madrid 4–3 in an outstanding game at a full and noisy Etihad Stadium to take a slender advantage to the Bernabéu. City scored in under 2 minutes as Kevin De Bruyne finished the fastest goal in European Cup semi-final history and had held a two goal advantage on three occasions during the tie, with several other good opportunities to increase their lead, only to see a resilient Madrid reduce their deficit to a single goal, including a brace and Panenka penalty from their top scorer, captain and talisman Karim Benzema. City would go onto regret these missed opportunities as they failed to reach the Champions League final in dramatic and heart-breaking circumstances. Leading the second leg 1–0 (5–3 on aggregate), from a 75th minute goal from Riyad Mahrez, and approaching the last minute of normal time, it appeared City were heading comfortably to the final, where they would have met Liverpool. However two goals in a minute from Madrid's substitute striker Rodrygo sent the game into extra time; and another penalty from Benzema five minutes later proved to be the winner as City were defeated 1–3 (5–6 on aggregate). Despite the heartbreaking defeat, City retained the third place in the UEFA rankings.

UEFA competitions

Non-UEFA competitions
In addition to the major UEFA competitions, Manchester City have also played a number of first team fixtures in other, more minor multi-national competitions. As winners of the 1970 League Cup, Manchester City played against the Coppa Italia winners Bologna in the Anglo-Italian League Cup. The competition started the previous year, as a way of enabling 1969 League Cup winners Swindon Town to play European opposition. For the first leg in Bologna, the City team stayed over 100 km (60 miles) away in the coastal resort of Rimini, and took a relaxed attitude to proceedings. City lost the match 1–0, and drew 2–2 at home, losing the competition.

After missing out on a UEFA berth for 1971–72, Manchester City were invited to play in the Texaco Cup, a competition for English, Scottish and Irish teams. City fielded a weakened side for the second leg of their tie against Airdrieonians. As punishment Manchester City had their £1,000 prize money withheld and were banned from the competition for two years. Upon the expiry of the suspension in 1974, the club entered the competition again, but exited in the group stage. The tournament saw Denis Law play his final matches as a professional. The withdrawal of Irish teams saw the competition renamed the Anglo-Scottish Cup the following year. Again, City failed to progress beyond the group stage.

Records

Competitive record

Finals

Lost semi-finals

*Other winning semi-finalists are shown in italics. Tournaments winners are in bold.

By country
UEFA competitions
Statistics are correct as of 5 October 2022.

Non-UEFA competitions

UEFA Coefficient
The UEFA club coefficients are based on the results of clubs competing in the five previous seasons of the UEFA Champions League, UEFA Europa League and UEFA Europa Conference League. The rankings determine the seeding of each club in relevant UEFA competition draws. The table and graph below show the progress of City's rankings in these coefficients since they re-entered the Europa League competition in 2010–11 as of the end of the season specified.

Club records
Record European victory (home): 7–0 v. Schalke 04, UEFA Champions League round of 16 second leg (12 March 2019) and v. RB Leipzig, UEFA Champions League round of 16 second leg (14 March 2023)
Record European victory (away): 0–5 v. Sporting CP, UEFA Champions League round of 16 first leg (15 February 2022).
Record European defeat (home): 1–3 v. Bayern Munich, UEFA Champions League group stage (2 October 2013).
Record European defeat (away): 0–4 v. Barcelona, UEFA Champions League group stage (19 October 2016).
Longest winning run in UEFA competitions: 7 matches,  9 December 2020 – 4 May 2021. 
Most home wins in a row (UEFA Champions League): 10 matches, 7 August 2020 – 24 November 2021.
Most Champions League wins in a single season: 11 matches, in the 2020–21 season (national record).
Longest unbeaten run in the UEFA Champions League: 12 matches, 21 October 2020 – 28 April 2021.
Longest unbeaten home run in the UEFA Champions League: 24 matches, 7 November 2018 – 14 March 2023 (ongoing), (national record).
Longest unbeaten away run in the UEFA Champions League: 10 matches, 18 September 2019 – 28 April 2021.
Most points amassed in a UEFA Champions League group: 16 points, in the 2020–21 season.
Fewest points amassed in a UEFA Champions League Group: 3 points, in the 2012–13 season.
Most goals scored in a single season: 30 goals, in the 2018–19 season.
Fewest goals conceded in one season: 5 goals, in the 2020–21 season.
Highest home attendance: 53,461 v. Liverpool, UEFA Champions League quarter-finals second leg (10 April 2018).

Player records
Most appearances: 75 – Fernandinho.
Most goals scored in European competitions: 43 – Sergio Agüero.
Most goals scored in the UEFA Champions League: 39 – Sergio Agüero.
Most goals scored in the play-off round: 3 – Sergio Agüero.
Most goals scored in the group stage: 27 – Sergio Agüero.
Most goals scored in the knockout phase: 9 – Sergio Agüero and Kevin De Bruyne
Most goals scored in a single season: 10  – Erling Haaland n the 2022–23 season (ongoing)
Most hat-tricks scored: 3 – Sergio Agüero (2011–2021).
Most hat-tricks in a single season: 2 – Sergio Agüero, in the 2016–17 season.
Most goals scored in a single match: 5 –  Erling Haaland (2022–23)
Most assists: 23 – Kevin De Bruyne.
Most assists in a single season: 4 – Kevin De Bruyne, in the 2017–18, 2018–19 and 2020–21 seasons.
Most assists in a single match: 3 – Kevin De Bruyne (vs. Tottenham Hotspur, UEFA Champions League, 17 April 2019) and João Cancelo (vs. Club Brugge, UEFA Champions League, 3 November 2021).
Most clean sheets: 25 – Ederson.

Manager records
Most decorated managers: 1 title – Joe Mercer.
Most games managed: 72 matches (including preliminary rounds) – Pep Guardiola.
Most matches won: 46 wins' (including preliminary rounds) – Pep Guardiola.

Notes

References

Bibliography

Europe
Manchester City